Oreta sambongsana is a moth in the family Drepanidae. It was described by Kyu-Tek Park, Minyoung Kim, Young-Dae Kwon and Eun-Mi Ji in 2011. It is found in Korea.

References

Moths described in 2011
Drepaninae